Carlton Husthwaite is a village and civil parish in the Hambleton district of North Yorkshire, England, about seven miles south-east of Thirsk.  According to the 2001 census it had a population of 167, increasing to 180 at the 2011 Census.

History

The village is mentioned in the Domesday Book as Carleton in the Yarlestre hundred. At the time of the Norman invasion, the lord of the manor was Ulf of Carleton, subsequently the lands were granted to the Archbishop of York.

The etymology of Carlton is derived from a combination the Old Norse word Carl, meaning free peasants, and the Anglo-Saxon word -ton, meaning farm or settlement. The second part of the name is derived from the Old Norse words of Hus and thwaite, for houses and meadow respectively.

Governance

The village lies within the Thirsk and Malton UK Parliament constituency. It also lies within the Stillington electoral division of North Yorkshire County Council and the White Horse ward of Hambleton District Council.

Geography

The nearest settlements to the village are Birdforth  to the south-west; Thormanby  to the south south-west; Husthwaite  to the south-east; Coxwold  to the east and Thirkleby  to the north-east.

The 2001 UK Census recorded the population as 167, of which 139 were over the age of sixteen and 82 of those were in employment. There were 72 dwellings of which 38 were detached.

There are a total of thirteen Grade II listed buildings (three II* listed) in the village, including the Church and the K6 style telephone kiosk.

Religion

There is a church in the village, dedicated to St Mary. The Grade II* listed church was erected in 1685 as a chapel of ease, though there may have been an earlier building on the same site. It underwent a renovation in 1885. A Wesleyan Chapel was also built in the village in 1869, but is now a private residence.

References

External links

Villages in North Yorkshire
Civil parishes in North Yorkshire